Wat Intharam Worawihan, also commonly known in short as Wat Intharam is a third-class royal temple in the area of Bang Yi Ruea, Thon Buri District, Bangkok. This temple is recognized as "the temple of King Taksin the Great" (1767–1782).

The temple built during the Ayutthaya era, this monastery with many names were "Wat Bang Yi Ruea Nok" (วัดบางยี่เรือนอก), "Wat Suan Phlu" (วัดสวนพลู), or "Wat Bang Yi Ruea Thai" (วัดบางยี่เรือไทย), etc. It was restored by King Taksin, who afterwards granted it the status of a royal temple. It was his favourite temple, where he came to stay overnight to meditate and observe religious precepts. 

In 1782, the temple was used to house the royal crematorium of the late King Taksin and his family, inside the temple there are also a pair of stūpa containing the ashes of him and his royal consort. It retained its status as a royal temple throughout the King Rama I's reign (1782–1809), with three high ranking monks governing the monastery. During the King Rama III's reign (1824–1851), a Mon-Persian descent nobleman, Phraya Sisahathep (Thongpheng) restored it once again and asked the King to grant it the status of a royal temple. The request was granted but to a lower status than before. It was named then Wat Intharam in present day. 

Wat Intharam is registered a national heritage by the Fine Arts Department since 1949.

Gallery

References

Thon Buri district
Buddhist temples in Bangkok
Registered ancient monuments in Bangkok